"Only the Young" is a song written by Jonathan Cain, Steve Perry and Neal Schon of the band Journey. It was sold to the band Scandal, who released it in 1984 on their Warrior album. Previously intended for Journey's Frontiers album, it was pulled from the album within days of recording in favor of songs "Back Talk" and "Troubled Child".

Background
The first individual outside the band to hear the song was sixteen-year-old Kenny Sykaluk of Rocky River, Ohio, who was diagnosed with cystic fibrosis. His mother wrote a letter to the band telling them about her son's terminal condition, and how big a fan he was of Journey. The band flew to his hospital bedside in Cleveland, Ohio at the request of the Make-A-Wish Foundation. Along with a Walkman containing the new track, the band also brought Kenny a football helmet signed by the San Francisco 49ers and an autographed Journey platinum record award. The experience of playing the song for Kenny left Steve Perry and Jonathan Cain deeply affected. Perry said, "As soon as I walked out of the hospital room, I lost it. Nurses had to take me to a room by myself." On the band's episode of VH1's Behind the Music, Cain broke down in tears recalling the event, remarking that "children should not have to live with that kind of pain". Kenny died the next day, with the Walkman still in his hand. The song brought life into perspective for the band and left them humbled. Neal Schon said that Kenny's death affected Journey by making them re-evaluate the issues that were causing friction inside the band itself. In honor of Kenny Sykaluk, the band used the song as their opener for the Raised on Radio Tour.

Reception
Cash Box said that the single is "Journey at its very best."

Chart performance
The song was eventually released as a single (which reached No. 9 on the Billboard Hot 100 chart, in March 1985) and appeared on the soundtrack to the 1985 film Vision Quest. It also reached No. 3 on the Mainstream Rock chart. The song's lyrical theme focuses on young people and the hope and future they all have in front of them. The song was featured later as a bonus track on the 2006 CD reissue of Frontiers.

Scandal version

The song was also recorded by American rock band Scandal in 1984. The song was featured on their album Warrior.

References

1983 songs
1985 singles
Journey (band) songs
Scandal (American band) songs
Songs written by Steve Perry
Songs written by Jonathan Cain
Songs written by Neal Schon
Songs written for films
Geffen Records singles
Songs about childhood